This is a list of tunnels documented by the Historic American Engineering Record in the US state of Washington.

Tunnels

See also
List of bridges documented by the Historic American Engineering Record in Washington (state)

References

Tunnels
Tunnels
Washington (state)